Parliamentary elections were held in Greece on 18 July 1875. Supporters of Alexandros Koumoundouros emerged as the largest bloc in Parliament, with 80 of the 190 seats. Koumoundouros became Prime Minister on 27 October.

Results

References

Greece
Parliamentary elections in Greece
1875 in Greece
Greece
1870s in Greek politics
Charilaos Trikoupis